This article provides details of Jolina Magdangal's television and film projects.

Films 

1Digitally restored, remastered, and re-released by the ABS-CBN Film Restoration Project.

Television

As a regular cast

Recurring / Multiple appearances

As a featured artist

Music videos

Television commercials
This article is currently being updated, hence, the list below is partial.

Notes

References

Actress filmographies
Philippine filmographies